The Sikula River is a river in Ambon Island, Maluku, Indonesia. It primarily flows in the Laha village of Ambon City, and is the longest river within the city's boundaries.

The river's course passes near the Pattimura International Airport, and in 2013 the river's flooding inundated the airport. Pebble is quarried along the river, generating pollution in the water.

References

Rivers of Maluku (province)